The Children's Country Home, also known as the Hospital for Sick Children, is a historic building located in Washington, D.C.'s Woodridge neighborhood.

History
Founded as a summer camp for sick children, the Norman cottage building was built in 1929 to 1930. 
It was designed by Nathan C. Wyeth, and Francis P. Sullivan.
First Lady Lou Henry Hoover laid the cornerstone.
There were additions in 1968, and 1991 to 1992.

See also
 National Register of Historic Places listings in the District of Columbia

References

External links
Hscfoundation.org: History of the Children's Country Home 
 National Register of Historic Places info for the Children's Country Home

Children's hospitals in the United States
Hospitals in Washington, D.C.
Buildings of the United States government in Washington, D.C.
Hospital buildings completed in 1930
Hospital buildings on the National Register of Historic Places in Washington, D.C.
Government buildings on the National Register of Historic Places in Washington, D.C.
Government buildings completed in 1930
Hospitals established in 1930
1930 establishments in Washington, D.C.
Neo-Norman architecture in the United States